Antonio Badú (August 13, 1914 – June 29, 1993) was a Mexican film actor and producer. He appeared in more than sixty films during his career, which began during the Golden Age of Mexican cinema.

Selected filmography
 ¡Ay qué rechula es Puebla! (1946)
 Ramona (1946)
 Cantaclaro (1946)
 Hypocrite (1949)
solo Veracruz es bello (1949)
 Love for Love (1950)
 A Gringo Girl in Mexico (1951)
Los Hijos De Maria Morales (1952)

Paco the Elegant (1952)
 Pain (1953)
The Life of Agustín Lara (1959)
 The White Renegade (1960)

References

Bibliography
 Sergio de la Mora. Cinemachismo: Masculinities and Sexuality in Mexican Film. University of Texas Press, 2009.

External links

1914 births
1993 deaths
Mexican male film actors
Mexican people of Lebanese descent
20th-century Mexican male actors
Mexican film producers